The 1999 New Zealand general election was held on 27 November 1999 to determine the composition of the 46th New Zealand Parliament. The governing National Party, led by Prime Minister Jenny Shipley, was defeated, being replaced by a coalition of Helen Clark's Labour Party and the smaller Alliance. This marked an end to nine years of the Fourth National Government, and the beginning of the Fifth Labour Government which would govern for nine years in turn, until its loss to the National Party in the 2008 general election. It was the first New Zealand election where both major parties had female leaders.

Background
Before the election, the National Party had an unstable hold on power. After the 1996 election National had formed a coalition with the populist New Zealand First party and its controversial leader, Winston Peters. The coalition was unpopular, as New Zealand First was seen as opposed to the National government, and had made many statements in the 1996 election campaign to that effect, such as saying that  only through New Zealand First could National Party be toppled, and Peters said that he would not accept Jim Bolger as Prime Minister, Bill Birch as Finance Minister or Jenny Shipley in a social welfare portfolio. NZ First's support crashed, though this was also partly caused by scandals and by mid-1997, NZ First was polling at as low as 2%. National also polled badly, and Jim Bolger was replaced as Prime Minister with Jenny Shipley.

Gradually, however, the relationship between the two parties deteriorated, and Peters took his party out of the coalition, after Shipley sacked him from her cabinet. A number of New Zealand First MPs deserted Peters, establishing themselves as independents or as members of newly established parties. By forming agreements with these MPs, National was able to keep itself in office, but its control was often unsteady. The polls were still initially close, but without NZ First support, National's chances of forming a government were slim. Eventually, Labour Party gained a solid lead over National.

The Labour Party, which had been in Opposition since losing the 1990 election, presented a strong challenge, particularly due to its agreement with the smaller Alliance party. The two had not previously enjoyed good relations, primarily due to the presence of the NewLabour Party as one of the Alliance's key members. NewLabour had been established by Jim Anderton, a former Labour MP who quit the party in protest over the economic reforms of Roger Douglas, which were often blamed for Labour's election loss in 1990. Gradually, as the Labour Party withdrew from "Rogernomics", the Alliance (led by Anderton) reduced its hostility towards Labour, but it was not until shortly before the 1999 election that a formal understanding was reached regarding a possible left-wing coalition. This agreement was deemed a necessary step towards building a credible alternative to the National Party.

This election was the first one in New Zealand's history where both main parties were led by women, being repeated again in the 2020 election.

MPs retiring in 1999 
Fifteen MPs intended to retire at the end of the 45th Parliament.

The election
The election took place on 27 November. Less than 84.1% of the 2,509,365 people registered to vote turned out for the election. This was the lowest turnout for some time, although it would drop further in the 2002 election. A total of 679 candidates stood for electorate seats, representing 36 parties. Party lists comprised 760 candidates from 22 parties. The new government was sworn in on 10 December.

In the election 965 candidates stood, and there were 22 registered parties with party lists. Of the candidates, 482 were electorate and list, 197 were electorate only, and 286 were list only. 67% of candidates (647) were male and 33% (318) female.

Opinion polling

Summary of results
Labour Party won 49 seats in parliament. When combined with the ten seats won by the Alliance, the coalition was two seats short of an absolute majority. It was able to form a new government with support from the Green Party, which entered parliament for the first time as an independent party (having previously been a part of the Alliance). The Green Party's entry to parliament was by a narrow margin, however – in order to gain seats, it needed to either win 5% of the party vote or win an electorate seat, neither of which the party appeared likely to do. Helen Clark openly encouraged Labour supporters in the Coromandel to give their constituency vote to Green Party co-leader Jeanette Fitzsimons and their party vote to Labour. However, when all special votes (that is, votes cast by people who were not able to attend a polling place in their electorate on the day of the election) were counted, the Greens had narrowly reached not one but both targets - Jeanette Fitzsimons won the electorate of Coromandel by 250 votes, and the party gained 5.16% of the vote.

The National Party, while not performing exceptionally poorly, failed to gain enough support to keep it in power. It won 39 seats, ten fewer than the Labour Party. ACT New Zealand, a potential coalition partner for National, gained nine seats. While this was an increase on ACT's previous election results, it was not sufficient to enable the National Party to form a government. National's former coalition partner, New Zealand First, performed poorly, with voters punishing it for the problems in the last government. The party received less than 5% of the vote, and so would have been removed from parliament had Winston Peters not retained his electorate of Tauranga, something he did by only 63 votes. None of the MPs who deserted New Zealand First were returned to parliament.

Detailed results

Parliamentary parties

| colspan=12 align=center| 
|- style="text-align:center;"
! colspan=2 rowspan=2 style="width:213px;" | Party
! Colspan=3 | Party vote
! Colspan=3 | Electorate vote
! Colspan=4 | Seats
|- style="text-align:center;"
! Votes
! %
! Change(pp)
! Votes
! %
! Change(pp)
! List
! Electorate
! Total
! +/-
|-
| 
| 800,199
| 38.74
| 10.55
| 854,736
| 41.75
| 10.67
| 8
| 41
| 49
| 12
|-
| 
| 629,932
| 30.50
| 3.37
| 641,361
| 31.32
| 1.99
| 17
| 22
| 39
| 5
|-
| 
| 159,859
| 7.74
| 2.36
| 141,322
| 6.90
| 4.35
| 9
| 1
| 10
| 3
|-
| 
| 145,493
| 7.04
| 0.94
| 92,445
| 4.52
| 0.77
| 9
| 0
| 9
| 1
|-
| 
| 106,560
| 5.16
| new
| 86,157
| 4.21
| new
| 6
| 1
| 7
| new
|-
| 
| 87,926
| 4.26
| 9.09
| 85,737
| 4.19
| 9.30
| 4
| 1
| 5
| 12
|-
| 
| 11,065
| 0.54
| 0.34
| 22,467
| 1.10
| 0.97
| 0
| 1
| 1
| 
|-
| 
| 49,154
| 2.38
| 1.95
| 44,885
| 2.19
| 0.19
| 0
| 0
| 0
| 
|-
| 
| 23,033
| 1.12
| new
| 19,289
| 0.94
| new
| 0
| 0
| 0
| new
|-
| 
| 22,687
| 1.10
| 0.56
| 6,519
| 0.32
| 0.15
| 0
| 0
| 0
| 
|-
|
| 5,949
| 0.29
| 0.26
| —
| —
| 0.03
| 0
| 0
| 0
| 
|-
|
| 5,190
| 0.25
| 0.05
| 3,925
| 0.19
| 0.04
| 0
| 0
| 0
| 
|-
|
| 4,008
| 0.19
| new
| 9,321
| 0.46
| new
| 0
| 0
| 0
| new
|-
|
| 3,244
| 0.17
| 0.01
| —
| —
| —
| 0
| 0
| 0
| 
|-
| 
| 3,191
| 0.15
| 0.14
| 3,633
| 0.18
| 0.32
| 0
| 0
| 0
| 
|-
|
| 2,912
| 0.14
| new
| 2,408
| 0.12
| new
| 0
| 0
| 0
| new
|-
| 
| 1,712
| 0.08
| 0.07
| 2,101
| 0.10
| 0.16
| 0
| 0
| 0
| 
|-
|
| 1,311
| 0.06
| new
| 267
| 0.01
| new
| 0
| 0
| 0
| new
|-
|
| 936
| 0.05
| new
| 688
| 0.03
| new
| 0
| 0
| 0
| new
|-
| style="background-color:#EEE" |
| style="text-align:left;" |Freedom Movement
| 454
| 0.02
| new
| 762
| 0.04
| new
| 0
| 0
| 0
| new
|-
| style="background-color:#639" |
| style="text-align:left;" |People's Choice
| 387
| 0.02
| new
| 154
| 0.01
| new
| 0
| 0
| 0
| new
|-
| 
| 292
| 0.01
| 0.01
| 231
| 0.01
| 
| 0
| 0
| 0
| 
|-
| style="background-color:#ffffff" |
| style="text-align:left;" |Unregistered parties
| —
| —
| —
| 2,354
| 0.11
| 0.04
| 0
| 0
| 0
| 
|-
| 
| —
| —
| —
| 23,004
| 1.12
| 0.08
| 0
| 0
| 0
| 
|-
! colspan=2 style="text-align:left;" | Valid votes
! 2,065,494
! 97.10
! 0.04
! 2,047,473
! 96.25
! 0.31
! Colspan=4 |
|-
| colspan=2 style="text-align:left;" | Informal votes
| 19,887
| 0.93
| 0.55
| 37,908
| 1.78
| 0.90
| Colspan=4 |
|-
| colspan=2 style="text-align:left;" | Disallowed votes
| 41,884
| 1.97
| 0.59
| 41,884
| 1.97
| 0.59
| Colspan=4 |
|-
! colspan=2 style="text-align:left;" | Total
! 2,127,265
! 100
!
! 2,127,265
! 100
!
! 53
! 67
! 120
!
|-
| colspan=2 style="text-align:left;" | Eligible voters and Turnout
| 2,509,365
| 84.77
| 3.51
| 2,509,365
| 84.77
| 3.51
| Colspan=4 |
|}
In addition to the registered parties listed above, some groups participated in the election without submitting party lists. Many of these were unregistered parties, lacking the necessary membership numbers for submitting a party list. There were, however, three registered ones that did not, for whatever reason, submit a party list. In total, 14 parties nominated electorate candidates only. By number of votes received, the most significant parties to do this were Te Tawharau (registered), Mana Wahine Te Ira Tangata (registered), the Equal Rights Party (unregistered), the Piri Wiri Tua Movement (unregistered), and the Asia Pacific United Party (registered). None of these parties were successful. There were also 36 independent candidates, also unsuccessful. The Mauri Pacific Party, established by a group of defectors from New Zealand First, failed to place even second in the electorates they held. Te Tawharau, which held a seat in parliament thanks to another New Zealand First defector, failed to retain its seat.

Votes summary

Electorate results

Of the 67 electorates in the 1999 election, a majority (41) were won by the opposition Labour Party. Included in Labour's total are the Maori seats, which it managed to regain after losing them to New Zealand First in the previous election. The governing National Party won 22 electorate seats, slightly less than a third of the total.

Four minor parties managed to win electorate seats. This proved important for some – neither New Zealand First nor United would have entered parliament if not for Winston Peters and Peter Dunne retaining their seats. Jim Anderton also retained his seat. The Greens won their first electorate seat when Jeanette Fitzsimons took Coromandel, although since the Greens crossed the 5% threshold, this was of less importance than originally thought. The Greens were not to repeat an electorate win until the 2020 election, with Chloë Swarbrick's plurality in Auckland Central.

The table below shows the results of the 1999 general election:

Key

|-
 |colspan=10 style="background-color:#FFDEAD" | General electorates
|-

|-
 |colspan=10 style="background-color:#FFDEAD" | Māori electorates
|-

|-

|}

List results

MPs returned via party lists, and unsuccessful candidates, were as follows:

Notes
 These party list members later entered parliament in the term as other list MPs elected resigned from parliament.
 These party list members later resigned during the parliamentary term.

Summary of seat changes
 Electoral redistributions:
 A minor reconfiguration of electorates and their boundaries occurred between the 1996 and 1999 elections. Six seats were abolished and eight were created, giving a net gain of two electorates.
 The seats of Mahia, New Lynn, Owairaka, Waipareira, Te Tai Rawhiti (Maori) and Te Puku O Te Whenua (Maori) ceased to exist.
 The seats of East Coast, Mt Albert, Mt Roskill, Te Atatu, Titirangi, Hauraki (Maori), Ikaroa-Rawhiti (Maori) and Waiariki (Maori) came into being.
 Seats captured:
 By Labour: Banks Peninsula, Hamilton West, Maungakiekie, Northcote, Rotorua and Wairarapa were captured from National. Te Tai Hauauru and Te Tai Tokerau were captured from Mauri Pacific. Wellington Central was captured from ACT. Te Tai Tonga was captured from New Zealand First.
 By the Greens: Coromandel was captured from National.
 Seats transferred from departing MPs to new MPs:
 Epsom, Kaikoura, Karapiro, Port Waikato, Rangitikei, Waitakere and Whangarei, all held by departing National MPs, were won by new National candidates. Two of the departing MPs remained in Parliament as list MPs, and another won a different electorate seat.
 The seats of Mana, Dunedin South and Waimakariri, all held by departing Labour MPs, were won by new Labour candidates. One of the departing MPs remained in Parliament as a list MP.
 Labour list seats: Lost 3 (was 11, fell to 8)
 Became electorate MPs: 7
 Re-elected: 5
 Newly elected: 3 (including a former electorate MP)
 National list seats: Gained 3 (was 14, rose to 17)
 Retired: 4
 Re-elected: 6
 Not re-elected: 3
 Newly elected: 11 (including 9 former electorate MPs)
 Alliance list seats: Lost 2 (was 11, fell to 9)
 Re-elected: 9
 (Became Green MPs: 2)
 ACT list seats: Gained 2 (was 7, rose to 9)
 Retired: 2
 Re-elected: 5
 Newly elected: 4 (including a former electorate MP)
 Green list seats: Gained 6 (was 0, rose to 6)
 (Former Alliance list MPs: 2)
 Became electorate MP: 1
 Re-elected: 1
 Newly elected: 5
 New Zealand First list seats: Lost 3 (was 7, fell to 4)
 Re-elected: 4
 Not re-elected: 3
 Christian Heritage list seats: Lost 1 (was 1, fell to 0)
 Not re-elected: 1
 Mauri Pacific list seats: Lost 2 (was 2, fell to 0)
 Not re-elected: 2
 Mana Wahine list seats: Lost 1 (was 1, fell to 0)
 Not re-elected: 1

Post-election events
The result in the Tauranga electorate was an extremely close three way race. New Zealand First leader Winston Peters beat National candidate Katherine O'Regan in a close race with Labour's Margaret Wilson in third. Labour sought a judicial recount as since New Zealand First won less than five percent of the party vote they would have no seats in parliament in at all if Peters lost the electorate (allowing Labour to govern solely with the Alliance and not needing the Greens). Peters criticised the recount as a waste of money. The recount resulted in Peters' majority increasing by one vote from 62 to 63.

A by-election to the Wellington City Council was caused after Eastern Ward councillor Sue Kedgley resigned her seat after she was elected a List MP for the Green Party, necessitating a by-election to fill the council vacancy. The by-election was won by Ray Ahipene-Mercer.

Notes

References

Further reading

External links
 Chief Electoral Office report
 New Zealand Election Survey results for 1999

 
November 1999 events in New Zealand